Wealden is a local government district in East Sussex, England. Its council is based in Hailsham. The district's name comes from the Weald, the remnant forest which was once unbroken and occupies much of the centre and north of the area.

History
Wealden District was formed on 1 April 1974, under the Local Government Act 1972, by the merger of the Hailsham and Uckfield Rural District Councils (RDCs),  both set up under the Local Government Act 1894, which also revived the parish councils.

Governance

Wealden District Council is elected every 4 years, with the Conservative party having had a majority on the council since the first election in 1973, apart from a couple of years after 1995 when no party had a majority. As of the last election in 2019 the council is composed of the following councillors:-
 

    
Although following a by-election on 22/9/22 in Maresfield ward, the Green Party now hold 3 seats with Conservatives slipping to 33.

The district is second-level in local government, responsible for town and country planning and domestic rubbish and recycling collections, for example. There are 45 members of the council, representing 41 wards. The towns have more than one ward: Crowborough has six; Hailsham, seven; Heathfield and Waldron, five; Uckfield, five; and Polegate, three. The ward boundaries are regularly redrawn in an attempt to maintain a standard number of electors per councillor. They are at 2007:

This district is entirely civil parished, enabling all farms and outlying homes to have an established community and influencing civic body, into:

Geography
Wealden District covers two main upland areas: the section of the High Weald within East Sussex; and the eastern end of the South Downs, between which lies the Vale of Sussex, the lowlands of which are named the Pevensey Levels. The River Ouse, some of the tributaries of which originate in the district, is the border with the Lewes District; and the River Cuckmere is wholly in Wealden. The English Channel to the south is interrupted by Eastbourne. The River Rother rises on the Weald and flows easterly to the east of Rye Bay. The Wealden basin contains significant reserves of shale oil, totalling 4.4 billion barrels of oil in Wealden and surrounding areas according to a 2014 study, which then Business and Energy Minister Michael Fallon said "will bring jobs and business opportunities" and significantly help with UK energy self-sufficiency. Fracking in the area is required to achieve these objectives, which has been opposed by environmental groups.

It is the central of the three East Sussex non-borough (low density) districts: the others being Lewes to the west, and Rother to the east.

Home ownership
The district has the highest proportion of home ownership of the 37 local authorities in Surrey, Sussex and Kent: combining the social (housing association and local authority provided) and private rented sectors, Brighton and Hove's returns recorded in 2011 that its rented sector comprised 44.4% of its housing, whereas 18.8% of Wealden's residents rented their homes.  Neighbouring Rother has a marginally higher proportion of homes owned outright, 3.1% greater and a greater rented sector.

Transport
The major trunk road is the A22, London to Eastbourne; it is crossed by the A26 Maidstone–Lewes road at Uckfield; and the A267 Tunbridge Wells to Eastbourne road. There are also  three west–east roads: the A259 coastal route; next inland is the A27 Pevensey–Brighton trunk road; and further to the north the A272 cross-country route to Winchester.

The East Coastway Line, serving Eastbourne and Hastings, uses the Vale of Sussex and has two station serving different sides of Pevensey in the district, which forms a generally suburban conurbation with Westham and a largely rural holiday and visitor coastline, Pevensey Bay.  The other railway line is the Uckfield Branch Line from London Bridge.

Wealden is crossed by a number of National Cycle Network routes:

Route 2 (South Coast Cycle Route) https://www.sustrans.org.uk/find-a-route-on-the-national-cycle-network/route-2/

Route 21 (London to Eastbourne) which makes use of the Forest Way and Cuckoo Trail paths along disused railway lines https://www.sustrans.org.uk/find-a-route-on-the-national-cycle-network/route-21/

Long-distance footpaths include the:

South Downs Way

Monarch's Way

Sussex Border Path

Wealdway.

Landmarks
Major landmarks include the Seven Sisters and Cuckmere Haven along the coast; and the Long Man of Wilmington together with all of the paths over the South Downs National Park.  Roman fortified hills can be found in the north of the area and Uckfield has a large architectural conservation area.

Sheffield Park Garden is an informal landscape garden now owned by the National Trust but laid out by Capability Brown.  Near to this is the terminus of the Bluebell Railway, a heritage, steam railway line.

A late medieval castle construction, moated Herstmonceux Castle, was begun in 1440. It is open to visitors and there are organised tours on a few summer days.

Ashdown Forest is to the north of the Weald and is the home of Winnie the Pooh.

See also
List of current places of worship in Wealden
List of former places of worship in Wealden

References

 
Non-metropolitan districts of East Sussex